The Beckwith Farmhouse was built in 1810.  It was listed on the United States National Register of Historic Places in 1987.  The listing included three contributing buildings.

It is located approximately 3 miles to the northwest of Cazenovia Village and is part of the Cazenovia Town Multiple Resource area.

References

Houses on the National Register of Historic Places in New York (state)
Federal architecture in New York (state)
Houses completed in 1810
Houses in Madison County, New York
National Register of Historic Places in Cazenovia, New York